Akinobu Hiranaka (平仲 明信, born Nobuaki Hiranaka, on November 14, 1963) is a former world champion boxer in the Light welterweight (Super lightweight or former Junior welterweight) division. He won the WBA Junior Welterweight championship of the world in 1992, and competed at the 1984 Los Angeles Olympic Games.

He is one of the few Japanese champions that lacked financial backing from large gyms or television companies, and he had to personally negotiate with opponents to land a shot at the world title.

Amateur career
Hiranaka won an amateur boxing tournament in high school, training at the local Ryukyu boxing gym. He continued boxing at Nippon University, and fought in the 1984 Los Angeles Olympics while attending (he lost in the second round). He had a successful amateur career, making 37 of his 43 wins by knockout.

Olympic results
Welterweight (– 67 kg), 1984
1st round bye
Lost to Genaro Leon (Mexico) 0-5

Professional career
Hiranaka's success in the amateur ring made him one of Japan's best prospects in the light welterweight division. He won the Japanese light welterweight title in only his fourth professional fight, knocking out his opponent in the 6th round. Hiranaka became the WBA's top-ranked fighter in the light welterweight division, but lack of financial support made it difficult for him to challenge the world title. He had to defend the Japanese light welterweight title 9 times before finally getting a fight at the world stage.

Hiranaka challenged Juan Martin Coggi of Argentina in Italy on April 29, 1989, for the WBA title. Hiranaka knocked Coggi down twice in the third round. However, Hiranaka lost by a decision for the first loss of his career. This match was controversial for the decision with excessive favor to the Italian-Argentine boxer Coggi, while Coggi was knocked down by Hiranaka twice and has been inferior to Hiranaka at performance throughout 12 rounds. Among many boxing fans, there have been the strong voice that the victory should have been given to Hiranaka, since the match was owned by him.

Even after losing, Hiranaka retained his world ranking, and waited for another chance for the world title. However, Hiranaka spent three years without a title match, and did not fight at all in 1990.

Hiranaka finally got his second chance in April 1992, fighting in Mexico City against Puerto Rican world champion, Edwin Rosario. Hiranaka surprised onlookers by knocking out the champion only 92 seconds into the first round. He immediately pinned the champion against the ropes, and landed a furious array of punches, until the referee saw that the champion Edwin Rosario had been knocked unconscious while standing up. This fight remains as the shortest world title match in the light welterweight division.

Despite making an epic entrance onto the world stage, Hiranaka lost his title after only five months to Morris East from the Philippines. Hiranaka had led the fight going into the 11th round, but was knocked out in an unexpected blow from the challenger. This knockout was named the 1992 Ring Magazine Knockout of the Year. Hiranaka was diagnosed with an intracranial hemorrhage after the fight, and was forced into retirement. His record was 20-2-0 (18KOs). He also has the highest KO percentage of any Japanese boxer (90%).

Post retirement
He now runs the Hiranaka Boxing School Gym in Okinawa, and has taught boxing at Seido Kaikan. Deceased K-1 champion Andy Hug trained at Hiranaka's gym in Okinawa before the K-1 Grand Prix tournament.

See also
List of WBA world champions
List of super lightweight boxing champions
List of Japanese boxing world champions
Boxing in Japan

References

External links
 
 Hiranaka Boxing School Gym 

1963 births
Sportspeople from Okinawa Prefecture
Living people
Olympic boxers of Japan
Boxers at the 1984 Summer Olympics
World Boxing Association champions
World boxing champions
Japanese male boxers
Light-welterweight boxers